Gallneukirchen (Central Bavarian: Goineikircha) is a small town in the Austrian state of Upper Austria and is part of the district Urfahr-Umgebung.

Motto 
Experience the city, enjoy the land – "Stadt erleben Land genießen (original)"

History 
In the year 1125, it was mentioned for the first time in a documentary as "Novenkirchen". At that time Gallneukirchen was just a market. Originally lying in the East part of the duchy of Bavaria (Germany), in the 12th century it belonged to the duchy "Austria", and in the year 1211, the market was included in the diocese of Passau for the next 200 years. In 1411, the brothers Caspar and Gundakar bought it from the Starhemberg family. Since 1490, it has belonged to the principality of "Österreich ob der Enns".
During the Napoleonic wars it was occupied several times, and now belongs to Upper Austria.
From 1832 to 1872 the Horse railway transported Goods and persons through Gallneukirchen.
In 1985 Gallneukirchen became a European municipality and 1992 Gallneukirchen incurred a partnership with Northeim in Lower Saxony.
The last large change was when Gallneukirchen became a city on 5 March 2001.

Population

Geography 
Gallneukirchen is at a height of 337 m at the lower part of the Mühlviertel. The dimension from north to south are 2.9 km and from west to east are 3 km.

Surface distribution

Neighbours

Rivers

The river Gusen flows through Gallneukirchen.

Politics

Constitution of the town council 
Election results of 28 September 2003

eligible to vote: 4609 +597, valid votes: 3480 +397, invalid: 110 −20, voter turnout: 77,9% −0,2%

City partnership 
Northeim in German.

Environment and infrastructure

Traffic 
 motorway A7 Mühlkreis Autobahn
 Busline

Public facilities 
 big open air swimming pool with red slide
 Senior living and care center
 Youth center
 Fitness studio "Feel Well"

Accumulation 
 Kindergarten
 Schools

Schools 
There are eight schools in the Gallneukirchen: 
 one primary school, 
 one elementary school, 
 two middle schools (HS1, NMS2), 
 one polytechnic (located in Riedegg 2 km away from Gallneukirchen), 
 one high school with focus on training for people who take care of people with disabilities (LHB), 
 one school for people with disabilities (Martin Boos Schule) 
 and one music school, although a new music school is being built close by which will cause heavy traffic problems because there is no parking space in its surrounding.

Kindergarten 
There are two kindergartens. One is located at the top of the "Linzerberg"

Personalities

Honorary citizens 
 Walter Hanl, Goldmedal Judoka

Sport 

 SVG: With almost 2,000 members in 15 sections, the sports club Gallneukirchen (SVG) is the largest of the "Urfahr Umgebung" district. It consists of the sections soccer, tennis, skiing, judo, chess, disabled sports, stick sports, triathlon, women's gymnastics, handball, athletics, swimming, table tennis and some more.The association was founded in 1948. Nationally known soccer players like Karl Irndorfer and Michael Mehlem are from Gallneukirchens SVG.
 There are also options to join a climbing club with a climbing hall in the Tennis Center of Gallneukirchen

Bakeries 
There are four bakeries in Gallneukirchen. Two are on the mainroad, Gammer and Haslinger. One is at the marketplace, Brunner. And one bakery of the Knott chain is next to the mainroad.

References

Cities and towns in Urfahr-Umgebung District